The 2004 South Carolina Gamecocks football team represented the University of South Carolina in the Southeastern Conference (SEC) during the 2004 NCAA Division I-A football season.  The Gamecocks were led by Lou Holtz in his sixth and final season as head coach and played their home games in Williams-Brice Stadium in Columbia, South Carolina.  Although they were bowl eligible, South Carolina declined to accept a bid due to the team's involvement in the Clemson–South Carolina football brawl.

Schedule
The September 11 game against Georgia played host to ESPN's College Gameday.

References

South Carolina
South Carolina Gamecocks football seasons
South Carolina Gamecocks football